Parroquia Canuto in Ecuador Province of Manabi born place in 1951 of Iván Bravo

Canuto is the Spanish and Portuguese form of the name Knut. As such, in those languages it refers to historical figures like Cnut the Great. Knut (Norwegian and Swedish), Knud (Danish), or Knútur (Icelandic) is a Scandinavian first name, of which the anglicized form is Cnut or Canute. In Germany both "Knut" and "Knud" are used. The name is derived from the Old Norse Knútr meaning "knot".

In English, it can refer to:

People
 Canuto Oreta (1938–2012), a Filipino politician
 Canuto Kallan (born in 1960), a Danish/Greek painter/visual artist
 Roberto F. Canuto (born in 1973), a Spanish film director.
 Sílvio José Canuto (born in 1977), a Brazilian football midfielder
 Ignacio Canuto (born in 1986), an Argentine football central defender

Places
 General Canuto A. Neri (municipality)
 Estadio Juan Canuto Pettengill